Gary S. Stebbing (born 11 August 1965) is a former professional footballer who played in The Football League for Crystal Palace, Southend United and Maidstone United. He was signed from the Crystal Palace junior ranks in 1983 and went on to play 102 times in the Football League Second Division for the club. In 1989 he signed for Football League newcomers Maidstone United. He was with the club for three years and played 76 times in the Football League Fourth Division, and was one of the club's final two registered players when they went bankrupt and resigned from the league in August 1992. He subsequently moved into non-league football with Kettering Town.

References

English footballers
Maidstone United F.C. (1897) players
Crystal Palace F.C. players
Southend United F.C. players
Kettering Town F.C. players
English Football League players
1965 births
Living people
K.V. Oostende players
Association football midfielders
Footballers from Croydon